Catherine Delneo is an American librarian, the State Librarian of Vermont.

Prior to this role, Delneo was the chief of branches at the San Francisco Public Library, a system in which she started working in 2006. Her first professional job was at the Somerset County Library System in Bridgewater, New Jersey, where she was a librarian for children and teens and later worked as a training coordinator for the system. As the state librarian, Delneo is also the commissioner of the Vermont Department of Libraries, overseeing a budget of $3.2 million in 2022.

Delneo was born and raised in South Burlington, Vermont. She has a Bachelor of Arts in philosophy from Vassar College and a Master of Library and Information Science from Rutgers University. She played cello in the Vermont Youth Orchestra from grades 6 through 12. She is also an avid open water swimmer and ice swimmer. She was the first woman documented to complete a round trip swim around Angel Island in San Francisco in 2013, and has circumnavigated Manhattan in a 12-hour marathon.

References

American librarians
American swimmers
Shark attack victims
Vassar College alumni
Rutgers University alumni
Living people
Year of birth missing (living people)